Jackson Davis may refer to:

Jackson Davis (actor) (born 1979), American actor
Jackson B. Davis (1918–2016), American politician
Jackson Davis (education official) (1882–1947), American educator